is a Japanese former professional baseball infielder who played for the Hanshin Tigers in Japan's Nippon Professional Baseball from 2011 to 2013.

External links

NPB stats

1989 births
Living people
People from Okayama Prefecture
Japanese baseball players
Hanshin Tigers players